Más bonita que ninguna is a 1965 Spanish film.

External links
 

1965 films
1960s romantic musical films
1960s Spanish-language films
Films shot in the Canary Islands
Films directed by Luis César Amadori
1960s Spanish films
Spanish romantic musical films